The Third Girl From the Left is a 1973 American made-for-television drama film directed by Peter Medak, written by Dory Previn, and starring Kim Novak and Tony Curtis.

It was the television film debut for both Novak and Curtis. Also in the cast are Michael Conrad, George Furth and Barbi Benton. The film was originally shown on October 16, 1973. Hugh Hefner was the Executive Producer for the film, which was made by Playboy Films.

Premise
Gloria Joyce is a chorus girl who has an affair with a delivery boy, David, when she realizes that her long-time affair with a nightclub comedian, Joey Jordan, is not going anywhere.

External links

References
Marill, Alvin H. Movies made for Television. 1980. Arlington House

1970s English-language films
1973 drama films
1973 television films
1973 films
Playboy Productions films
ABC Movie of the Week
1970s American films